The Battle of Khotyn or Battle of Chocim or Hotin War was a battle on 11 November 1673, where the forces of the Polish–Lithuanian Commonwealth under the Grand Hetman of the Polish Crown John Sobieski defeated Ottoman Empire forces, with Moldavian and Wallachian regiments, led by Husein Pasha. It reversed the fortunes of the previous year, when Commonwealth weakness led to the signing of the Treaty of Buchach, and allowed John Sobieski to win the upcoming royal election and become the king of Poland.

Description

Polish-Lithuanian forces were 30,000 strong. The Ottomans commanded 35,000 troops and 120 guns. Rockets made by Kazimierz Siemienowicz were used successfully. The victory allowed the Commonwealth to revoke the unfavourable Peace of Buchach and set the stage for the role Sobieski was to play in the Battle of Vienna in 1683.

Name
Khotyn was conquered and controlled by many states, resulting in many name changes. Other name variations include Chotyn, or Choczim (especially in Polish).

Aftermath

In result of the battle the Ottoman army suffered crippling losses. It lost two-thirds of its count in either killed or wounded. On top of that Moldavian and Wallachian troops switched sides and decided to support the Commonwealth.
The Turkish forces withdrew from Poland after their supplies and most of their artillery were captured but they retained most of western Ukraine. Sobieski and the nobles returned to Warsaw for elections following the death of Michael Wisniowiecki, King of Poland, the day before the battle.

Bibliography 
Alan Palmer, The Decline and Fall of the Ottoman Empire, Published by Barnes & Noble Publishing, 1992. .
 Winged Hussars, Radoslaw Sikora, Bartosz Musialowicz, BUM Magazine, 2016.

References 

Conflicts in 1673
1673 in Europe
Khotyn 1673
Khotyn 1673
Khotyn 1673
Khotyn 1673
Khotyn 1673
Military history of Ukraine
History of Chernivtsi Oblast
Khotyn